Daysville may refer to:

Daysville, Illinois, an unincorporated community in Ogle County
Daysville, West Virginia, an unincorporated community in Upshur County+

See also
Dayville (disambiguation)